Uruguay participated in the 2010 Summer Youth Olympics in Singapore.

Medalists

Equestrian

Swimming

Taekwondo

References

External links
Competitors List: Uruguay

2010 in Uruguayan sport
Nations at the 2010 Summer Youth Olympics
Uruguay at the Youth Olympics